Lakshmipur is a city and headquarter of 
Lakshmipur District 
in the Chittagong Division, Bangladesh.

References

Lakshmipur District
Towns in Bangladesh